Flaminius Raiberti (13 April 1862 – 16 December 1929) was a French politician who was a Radical Republican deputy for Nice for 32 years, and then a member of the Senate for seven years. He was Minister for War and then Minister of the Navy after World War I (1914–18).

Life

Early years
Baron Flaminius Raiberti was born in Nice, Alpes-Maritimes on 13 April 1862 into an aristocratic family.
He was descended from Louis Raiberti, a "notaire ducal" of Saint-Martin-Lantosque (today Saint-Martin-Vésubie) who died in 1639.
Some of his ancestors served in the army of the Kingdom of Sardinia.
He enrolled in the Faculty of Law and then joined the Bar of Nice.
In 1888 Raiberti founded a journal, La Révision, which reflected Boulangist views.
However, he abandoned Boulangism before becoming a deputy.
He became a General Councilor, then on 30 March 1890 was elected to the Chamber of Deputies for the 1st district of Nice.

Deputy

Raiberti was aged 27 when he was elected, and would hold office for 32 years until entering the Senate in 1922.
He was reelected for the same seat on 20 August 1893 as a Radical candidate, and was again reelected on 8 May 1898, on 27 April 1902, on 6 May 1906, on 26 April 1914 and on 16 November 1919  on the Republican and Democratic Union platform. Raiberti was vice-president of the Budget Committee in 1917, and was later Chairman of the Finance Committee.
He showed his liberal views in discussions on employment contracts, social assistance, workers' pensions, working hours and subsidized housing.
Raiberti became a member of the Association internationale pour la protection légale des travaileurs, which aimed for the unification of international labor unification. 
In 1908 he joined the Musée social, primarily to participate in its new section on urban and rural hygiene.

Local politics

Raiberti rejected the dual mandate, refusing to become a candidate for Mayor of Nice, which he felt would give him undue advantage in national elections.
However he was General Councilor for Contes from 1901 and was elected to represent Menton in 1919.
He was president of the Alpes-Maritimes Departmental Assembly from 1911 to 1927.
During his long term of office Raiberti converted the Alpes-Maritimes to a more democratic Republicanism in place of rule by opportunistic notables.
The old guard of politicians, whose power he gradually attacked, had close ties to banking, insurance, railway and real estate interests and used vote-buying and intimidation to stay in power.
As a deputy he intervened in budget discussion in favor of development of his region, and played an important role in development of railways, including the Puget-Théniers – Saint-André line and the Nice – Cuneo line that connects Nice to the Italian border. He also ensured fast trains from Nice to Paris.

Minister and Senator

Raiberti was briefly Minister of War in the cabinet of Georges Leygues from 16 December 1920 to 16 January 1921.
After leaving this post during a cabinet reshuffle he was elected vice president of the Chamber of Deputies in 1921, and re-elected to this position in 1922.
Raiberti was Minister of Marine in the cabinet of Raymond Poincaré from 15 January 1922 to 29 March 1924.
He was elected Senator for Alpes-Maritimes on 26 March 1922, retaining his post as minister.
Under his leadership legislation was introduced to renovate the navy,
He left the government in 1924, and returned to parliamentary work in the Senate's Finance, Army and Air committees.
In failing health, he lost the election of 20 October 1929. Flaminius Raiberti died in Nice on 16 December 1929 aged 67.

Legacy

The D15 in Contes, Alpes-Maritimes to the north of Nice is named the Avenue Flaminius Raiberti.
The Musée ferroviaire Flaminius Raiberti (Flaminius Raiberti Railway Museum) is a fully renovated station concourse in the hamlet of Sainte Thècle in the Vallée du Peillon. 
It describes the Chemins de fer de Paris à Lyon et à la Méditerranée (PLM) network, and focuses on construction of the single-track railway line from Nice to Cuneo, Italy.

Publications

References

Sources

1862 births
1929 deaths
French Senators of the Third Republic
French Ministers of War
Ministers of Marine
Senators of Alpes-Maritimes
People from Nice